Fusarium langsethiae is a species of fungus in the family Nectriaceae. It is a suspected plant pathogen. This species was isolated from oats, wheat and barley kernels in several European countries. It resembles Fusarium poae, from which it differs by slower growth, less aerial mycelium and absence of odour. Its turnip-shaped or spherical conidia are borne in the aerial mycelium, whereas those of F. poae are produced on straight monophialides mostly in the aerial mycelium. It does not produce sporodochial conidia.

References

Further reading

External links

Study of Fusarium langsethiae infection in UK cereals

Fungi described in 2004
Fungal plant pathogens and diseases
langsethiae